O'Bryant Square is a square that was a small park and fountain at the intersection of Southwest Park Avenue and Southwest Harvey Milk Street in downtown Portland, Oregon, in the United States. It is named after Hugh O'Bryant, Portland's first mayor. Although officially named O'Bryant Square, it is also known as "Paranoid Park", "Paranoia Park","Needle Park", and "Crack Park". Aaron Mesh, writing for Willamette Week  on an article discussing plans for a park space in Northwest District described city's reluctance to commit to a plaza because "junkie haven O'Bryant Square, or "Paranoid Park"—have been a security hassle."

History and features 
In 1971, the property was donated to the city by Mr. and Mrs. William E. Roberts, having once contained a quarter-block building and surface parking. Development of the park and underground parking cost $1.25 million, backed by federal grants and bonds built on the projected parking revenue. The square and fountain were dedicated in 1973.  The park was popular in both the business and planning communities and in 1976, received a national design award from the United States Department of Housing and Urban Development.

Laurie Olin was brought on to redesign the park in 2006 when he was designing Director Park. Olin called O'Bryant "a real ugly duckling". In 2007, The Oregonian called it "a relic of 1970s urban design".

In March 2018, the park was closed indefinitely by the City of Portland, citing safety concerns related to structural issues in the underground parking garage.

References

External links

 

1973 establishments in Oregon
Garages (parking) in the United States
Parks in Portland, Oregon
Protected areas established in 1973
Southwest Portland, Oregon